Robert Shulman or Schulman may refer to:

 Robert G. Shulman (born 1924), American biophysicist 
 Robert Shulman (serial killer) (1954–2006), American serial killer
 Robert Schulman (journalist) (1917–2008), American journalist, co-founder of the Louisville Eccentric Observer
 E. Robert Schulman, pen name of American astronomer and science humorist Eric Schulman

See also
 Schulman (disambiguation)
 Shulman (disambiguation)